Kouhbane (also Romanized as Kouhbane and Kouhbane) is a village in Ahandan Rural District, in the Central District of Lahijan County, Gilan Province, Iran. At the 2006 census, its population was 1,453, in 398 families.

Central District Branch of the rural city of Gilan province of Iran. The village, like most villages towering Alborz Mountains along the West Branch is mountainous and is drawn. Most people in this village are agriculture and the cultivation of tea and rice.

References 

Populated places in Lahijan County